Bryan Andrew Soane (born 11 July 1988) is an Australian footballer.

Youth

Hailing from the Penrith area, he played for Emu Plains FC from their Under-sixes through to the Under-11s. Picked as a representative player for the Penrith Panthers' youth team, he played in their Under-12, Under-13 and Under-14 teams. Next he moved to Bankstown City FC, featuring in their Under-15 side and was even selected for their squad travelling to Spain where they played opposition such as Real Madrid Youth. Later, he joined Blacktown City FC, performing with their Under-16, Under-17 and Under-18 sides.

Career

NPL NSW

Mostly known for being a proficient goal-scorer with Sydney Wanderers FC, he scored 21 goals in 47 appearances in two seasons, claiming the 2007 Player of the Year and top scorer of his club.
Well-traveled coach John Stewart Porter acknowledged his shooting ability stating that he 'had a tremendous hot' and that 'he has very impressive physique, works very hard at all aspects of the game, and can play well anywhere up front'. Soane returned to his youth club Blacktown Spartans FC in 2014 and was one of six players from the Penrith and Blue Mountains area.

S.League

Quitting his job to play professionally in the S.League with Balestier Khalsa FC, he began a meticulous daily training routine. Aiming to play in the A-League, the Australian top division, he saw the S.League as a stepping-stone to that target, quitting Balestier a month before the expiry of his contract in June 2009 after claiming 'mistreatment' form the club.

References

External links
 Player Statistics for Bryan Soane
 
 First goal for Balestier Khalsa

1988 births
Living people
Australian soccer players
Sportsmen from New South Wales
Soccer players from Sydney
Association football forwards
Balestier Khalsa FC players
Singapore Premier League players
Expatriate footballers in Singapore
Blacktown City FC players
Australian expatriate soccer players
Australian expatriate sportspeople in Singapore